Stavešinci (in older sources also Stavenci) is a small village in the Ščavnica Valley in the Municipality of Gornja Radgona in northeastern Slovenia.

There is a small chapel-shrine with an onion-domed belfry just north of the main settlement. It was built in 1922.

References

External links
Stavešinci on Geopedia

Populated places in the Municipality of Gornja Radgona